Karimpuzha is a gram panchayat in the Palakkad district, state of Kerala, India. It is a local government organisation that serves the villages of Karimpuzha-I and Karimpuzha-II.

Important Organizations
 Lt.Col.Niranjan Memorial I.T.I., Elambulassery

Demographics
 India census, Karimpuzha-I had a population of 17,744 with 8,539 males and 9,205 females.

 India census, Karimpuzha-II had a population of 11,992 with 5,749 males and 6,243 females.

Elambulassery
Elambulassery is a small village near Sreekrishnapuram in Karimpuzha Panchayath.  It is about 33 km from Palakkad. The village is surrounded by Mannarkkad, Ottappalam, Perinthalmanna and Attappadi.

References 

Gram panchayats in Palakkad district